Pavsikakiy is a Christian male given name used in Slavonic countries, such as Russia, Belarus and Ukraine, although its use has declined in modern times.

Etymology
The name Pavsikakiy derives from the 6th-century saint Pausicacus of Synada. The name is of Greek origin, παυσίκακος, formed from the words παῦσις (pavsis) «to stop, to cease» and κακία (kakia) «evil, misfortune»; it means literally «he who stops evil».

Spelling

Nameday
Name-day is in 26 May.

People
Famous people:
 Pausicacus of Synada (Pavsikakiy Sinadsky) is a Christian saint, monk, ascetic, a bishop of Sinadsky church in Syria.
Pavsekakiy Bogdanov is a Kursk healer, diviner and astrologist, who has become famous by helping TV-stars of Russian show business.

See also
 Slavic names

References

Further reading

Slavic masculine given names
Belarusian masculine given names
Russian masculine given names
Ukrainian masculine given names